Giannades is a village in the northwestern part of the island of Corfu.  It is located in the municipal unit of Parelioi.  In 2011 its population was 565 for the village and 597 for the community, which includes the village Ermones.  Giannades is located 13 km west of the city of Corfu and 7 km southeast of Palaiokastritsa. Giannades is situated on a hillside, 1.5 km from the coast.

Population

See also

List of settlements in the Corfu regional unit

References

External links
 Giannades at the GTP Travel Pages

Populated places in Corfu (regional unit)